Following are the results of the 2002 Formula Renault season.  Formula Renault is a class of formula racing founded in 1971.  Regarded as an entry-level series to motor racing, it is a respected series where drivers can learn advanced racecraft before moving on to Formula Three, World Series by Renault, GP2 or Formula One.

Other Formats
 Formula Renault 3.5L
 Formula Renault 2000 Eurocup

2002 Formula Renault 2000 UK season

2002 Formula Renault 2000 Scandinavia season

References

External links

Formula Renault seasons